Estola hispida is a species of beetle in the family Cerambycidae. It was described by Lameere in 1893. It is known from Venezuela.

References

Estola
Beetles described in 1893